This article is a list of major airlines by the number of aircraft owned. American Airlines having the most at 913 aircraft, and Nauru Airlines having the least at 5 aircraft.

List

References

Fleet size